Gundlapochampalle or Gundla Pochampalli is a village in Medchal mandal of Rangareddi district, Telangana, India.

Demographics
According to Indian census, 2001, the demographic details of Gundlapochampalle village is as follows:
 Total Population: 	5,197 in 1,161 Households
 Male Population: 	2,697 and Female Population: 	2,500
 Children Under 6-years of age: 746 (Boys - 371 and Girls -	375)
 Total Literates: 	2,639

Features
 There is a Railway station with regular services from Secunderabad via. Malkajgiri, Alwal, Bolarum, Medchal to Manoharabad.and Basar, Nanded
 There are suburban bus services from Secunderabad.

References

Villages in Ranga Reddy district

Neighbourhoods in Hyderabad, India